Mac Tools (previously, Mechanics Tool and Forge Company) is an American company that distributes and markets professional tools and related equipment. It is headquartered in Westerville, Ohio, United States. The Mac Tools line consists of over 8,000 professional tools, including screwdrivers, ratchets, wrenches, and assorted air tools. 

Mac Tools also produces its own line of tool storage and carts with foreign sourced materials at its manufacturing plant located in Allentown, Pennsylvania. Mac Tools manufactured tools are produced in various Stanley Black & Decker facilities around the world. Mac Tools USA hardline tools are manufactured in their partner plant of Proto Dallas. 

Their primary distribution center is located in Hilliard, Ohio, United States. Mac Tools business model is a franchise system with roughly 1500 distributors across North America. Their primary competitors include Matco, Snap-on, and Cornwell Tools.

History
In 1938, the Mechanics Tool and Forge Company began in Sabina, Ohio. The company's goal was to manufacture high quality mechanic's tools. On July 11, 1938, the firm was incorporated in Ohio, and common stock was issued. Mac Tools continued to grow in the 1940s, with a large government contract received in 1942. 

The company's name was changed in 1961 to the now familiar Mac Tools from its earlier name, Mechanics Tool and Forge Company. In 1980, Mac Tools was bought by the Stanley Works, and is now part of a group of brands including Stanley Tools, Proto, Facom, and Blackhawk a subsidiary of Proto Tools.

In 1990, Mac Tools set up in the United Kingdom, and in 2009, it changed its presence in the United Kingdom from being a distribution to a franchise system.

References

External links

Tool manufacturing companies of the United States
Manufacturing companies based in Ohio
Manufacturing companies established in 1938
Automotive tool manufacturers
Stanley Black & Decker brands
1938 establishments in Ohio
1980 mergers and acquisitions